Thomas Junta was an American hockey dad from Reading, Massachusetts who was convicted of involuntary manslaughter in 2002 after his attack on Michael Costin led to Costin's death. Costin was the informal referee of a pick-up hockey game involving the men's sons. The attack and the fight which ensued was witnessed by about a dozen children, including Junta's son and Costin's three sons.

Junta was originally charged with voluntary manslaughter. The jury acquitted him on this charge, instead convicting him of involuntary manslaughter, a lesser offense, on the basis of his claim of self-defense. Judge Charles Grabau sentenced Junta to incarceration for six to ten years.

In April 2008, Junta was denied parole for the second time. In denying his request, the Massachusetts Parole Board said that "Junta had failed to fully accept responsibility for his actions".

Junta was eventually released on August 27, 2010. He died on December 16, 2020 after a battle with cancer.

References

External links
Court TV coverage of Thomas Junta, the hockey dad convicted of manslaughter
RINK RAGE:The Killing of Michael Costin USNewsLink, Judith Haney, 2002

Year of birth missing
20th-century births
2020 deaths
American people convicted of manslaughter
Place of birth missing
Prisoners and detainees of Massachusetts
People from Reading, Massachusetts
Ice hockey people from Massachusetts